Per Ung (5 June 1933 – 20 June 2013) was a Norwegian sculptor and graphic artist.

Biography
Ung was born in Oslo, Norway. He was the son of Per Ohlsen (1907–85) and Randi Tangen (1905-89). He was schooled in the conservative sculptural tradition but gradually distanced himself from formal and substantive traditionalism.   He received his sculptor education under the influential of Per Palle Storm (1910–1994) at the Norwegian National Academy of Fine Arts from 1952-55.  He became a student of Anthony Caro (1924–2013) at St. Martin's School of Art in London in 1960.

Ung made a number of public portrait statues and monuments, most of them on private assignments.
His first large public commission was the statue of actress Johanne Dybwad (bronze. 1959), located on Johanne Dybwads plass outside the National Theatre in Oslo. His monument of figure skater Sonja Henie  ( (bronze. 1985) is located at Frogner stadion. His statue of  Nobel Prize laureate Fridtjof Nansen (bronze. 1993) is placed outside the Fram building at Bygdøy. A monument of the composer Johan Halvorsen (bronze. 2002) is placed outside the National Theatre in Oslo.

Ung was member and served as chairman of the Norwegian Association of Sculptors (Norsk Billedhuggerforening), was a member of the Young Artists Society (Unge Kunstneres Samfund) and served on the Board of Supervisors of  Kunstnernes Hus in Oslo from 1967-69. He was granted the A. C. Houens legat in 1953, Conrad Mohrs legat  in 1958 and 1964, Moltzaus legat in 1957 and Lorch-Schives legat in 1960. He received the Ingeborg og Per Palle Storms ærespris in 1995. In 2007, he was appointed Knight 1st Class in the Order of St. Olav.

Personal life
He was married in 1953  to Valerie Lyndall Dick, marriage dissolved 1987.
He was married in 1987 with sculptor Elena Engelsen-Wisse, daughter of  woodcarver and illustrator Henning Engelsen (1918–2005).  
Per Ung died of cancer in Oslo during 2013 at the age of 80.

Selected works
Korsfestet (bronze. 1970) Tasta Church, Stavanger
Kvinne og måker (bronze. 1974) Etterstad videregående skole, Oslo 
Eros og Psyke (bronze. 1982) Veterinærhøgskolen, Oslo
Fiskerkone (bronze. 1999) Svolvær
Otto Sverdrup (bronze. 1999) Sandvika, Bærum
Fru Fortuna (bronze. 2005) Europarådets plass, Oslo

See also
Oslo Astrological Clock

References

External links
Per Ung official website

1933 births
2013 deaths
Oslo National Academy of the Arts alumni
20th-century Norwegian sculptors
Artists from Oslo
Deaths from cancer in Norway
Recipients of the St. Olav's Medal